The South American great horned owl (Bubo virginianus nacurutu), also known as the Colombian great horned owl, Venezuelen great horned owl, or desert great horned owl, is a subspecies of the great horned owl, Bubo virginianus. It lives in tropical South America. It generally occurs in more open areas than the North American great horned owls, and avoids dense humid forest, e.g. the Amazon Rainforest. Unlike other subspecies of the great horned owl, the eyes of the South American horned owl are amber rather than yellow. Although the largest owl in its range, it is a relatively small horned owl.

Taxonomy
Two additional taxa from the great horned owl superspecies are native to South America: B. v. nigrescens of the north Andean highlands and B. (v.) magellanicus of southern and west-central South America. The latter is distinctive and may come into contact with either the South American horned owl (in Argentina/Bolivia) or B. v. nigrescens (in Peru), and is now commonly regarded as a valid species, the lesser horned owl. Early authorities suggested the South American great horned owl was a valid species with nigrescens and magellanicus as subspecies, but this is not supported by any recent authorities, although the South American great horned owl in itself is relatively distinctive compared to nigrescens, magellanicus and the various North American subspecies of the great horned owl.

Description
The South American great horned owl is a dull brownish colour with a long bill; birds from the semi-arid interior of Brazil often have much white on uppertail-coverts and ear-coverts. The iris is amber, not yellow.

Distribution and habitat
The South American great horned owl is known from eastern Colombia, Venezuela, Belize, French Guiana, northeastern Brazil, Bolivia, Paraguay, Uruguay and Argentina.

References

Bubo (genus)
Birds described in 1817
Taxa named by Louis Jean Pierre Vieillot